Chappy—That's All is a 1924 British silent drama film directed by Thomas Bentley and starring Joyce Dearsley, Gertrude McCoy and Lewis Gilbert. It was based on a novel by Oliver Sandys. It was made at Stoll Pictures' Cricklewood Studios.

Cast
 Joyce Dearsley as Chappy 
 Gertrude McCoy as Bettina 
 Lewis Gilbert as Piper 
 Eva Westlake as Mrs. Cherry 
 Edwin Greenwood as Slim Jim 
 Francis Lister

References

Bibliography
 Low, Rachael. History of the British Film, 1918-1929. George Allen & Unwin, 1971.

External links

1924 films
1924 drama films
British drama films
1920s English-language films
Films directed by Thomas Bentley
Stoll Pictures films
Films based on British novels
Films set in England
British silent feature films
British black-and-white films
Silent drama films
1920s British films